Adalet is a Turkish word, and it may refer to:

Given name
Adalet Ağaoğlu (1929–2020), Turkish female novelist and playwright
Adalet Cimcoz (1910–1970), Turkish art curator, voice actress, critic and translator
Adalet Shukurov (born 1966), Azerbaijani pop singer

Other uses
Justice Party (Turkey) (1961–1981), a defunct Turkish political party
Justice and Development Party (Turkey) (founded 2001), a Turkish political party

See also
Adalat (disambiguation)

Turkish given names